Gasteria glomerata (the "Kouga Gasteria") is a small succulent plant, native to the Eastern Cape, South Africa.

Description

This dwarf species of Gasteria has its rounded tongue-shaped leaves in two opposite rows. They are slightly rough in texture, and often strongly recurved.

It is highly proliferous, and forms dense clumps. The flowers are exceptionally fat and fleshy ("gasteriform"). 
The species name, "glomerata", means clumped or clustered into a head.

Distribution
It occurs in the vicinity of the Kouga Dam, near Port Elizabeth in the Eastern Cape, South Africa. Within this very small natural range, it occurs on steep cliff faces.

It thrives in cultivation, and is widely propagated around the world as an ornamental succulent.

References

Flora of the Cape Provinces
glomerata